Garland is a city in the U.S. state of Texas. It is located northeast of Dallas and is a part of the Dallas–Fort Worth metroplex. It is located within Dallas County except for small portions located in Collin and Rockwall Counties. At the 2010 census, the city had a population of 226,876. In 2019, the population rose to 239,928, making it the 93rd-most populous city in the United States of America and the 12th-most populous city in Texas; by 2020, it had a population of 246,018. Garland is the third largest city in Dallas County by population and has access to downtown Dallas via public transportation including two Dart Blue Line stations and buses.

History

Immigrants began arriving in the Peters colony area around 1850, but a community was not created until 1874. Two communities sprang up in the area: Embree, named for physician K. H. Embree, and Duck Creek, named for the local creek of the same name. A rivalry between the two towns ensued as the area began to grow around the Santa Fe Railroad depot.

Eventually, to settle a dispute regarding which town should have the local post office, Dallas County Judge Thomas A. Nash asked visiting Congressman Joe Abbott to move the post office between the two towns. The move was completed in 1887. The new location was named Garland after U.S. Attorney General Augustus Hill Garland.

Soon after, the towns of Embree and Duck Creek were combined, and the three areas combined to form the city of Garland, which was incorporated in 1891. By 1904, the town had a population of 819 people.

In 1920, local businessmen financed a new electrical generator plant (sold by Fairbanks-Morse) for the town. This later led to the formation of Garland Power and Light, the municipal electric provider that still powers the city today.

On May 9, 1927, a devastating F4 tornado struck the town and killed 15 people, including the former mayor, S. E. Nicholson.

Businesses began to move back into the area in the late 1930s. The Craddock food company and later the Byer-Rolnick hat factory (now owned by Resistol) moved into the area. In 1937, KRLD, a major Dallas radio station, built its radio antenna tower in Garland, and it is operational to this day.

During World War II, several aircraft plants were operated in the area, and the Kraft Foods company purchased a vacant one after the war for its own use. By 1950, the population of Garland exceeded 10,000 people. From 1950 to 1954, though, the Dallas/Garland area suffered from a serious and extended drought, so to supplement the water provided by wells, Garland began using the water from the nearby Lake Lavon.

The suburban population boom that the whole country experienced after World War II also reached Garland by 1960, when the population nearly quadrupled from the 1950 figure to about 38,500. By 1970, the population had doubled to about 81,500. By 1980, the population reached 138,850. Charles R. Matthews served as mayor in the 1980s; he was later a member of the elected Texas Railroad Commission.

In the 2000s, Garland added several notable developments, mostly in the northern portion of the city. Hawaiian Falls waterpark opened in 2003. (Garland formerly had a Wet 'n Wild waterpark, which closed in 1993). The Garland Independent School District's Curtis Culwell Center (formerly called the Special Events Center), an arena and conference facility, opened in 2005. Later that year, Firewheel Town Center, a Main Street-style outdoor mall, owned by Simon Property Group, opened in October 2005.

It has over 100 business and includes an AMC theater. In 2009, the city, in conjunction with developer Trammell Crow Company, finished a public/private partnership to develop the old parking lot (the land between 5th Street, 6th Street, and on the north side of Austin Street) into a new mixed-use, transit-oriented development named 5th Street Crossing. Cater-corner to both City Hall and the downtown DART Rail station, the project consists of 189 residential apartment units,  of flex retail, and six live-work units.

The southeast side of Garland suffered a major blow on the night of December 26, 2015, after a large EF4 tornado struck the area, moving north from Sunnyvale. At least eight fatalities were confirmed in the city from this event.

Geography

Garland is located at  (32.907325, –96.635197). According to the United States Census Bureau, the city has a total area of 57.1 sq mi (147.9 km), all land.

Neighborhoods and historical communities

 Buckingham North
 Duck Creek
 Centerville
 Club Hill
 Eastern Hills
 Embree
 Firewheel
 Oaks
 Rose Hill
 Spring Park
 Travis College Hill Addition
 Valley Creek*
 The 5
 Oakridge
 Brentwood Place
 Brentwood Village

Climate

Garland is part of the humid subtropical region. The average warmest month is July, with the highest recorded temperature being  in 2000. The maximum average precipitation occurs in May.

Demographics

According to the 2020 United States census, there were 246,018 people, 75,886 households, and 56,868 families residing in the city, up from 226,876 people, 75,696 households, and 56,272 families residing in the city at the 2010 census. The population density was 3,973.3 people/sq mi (1,534.1/km). The 80,834 housing units averaged 1,415.7/sq mi (546.5/km). The 2019 census estimates placed the population at 239,928.

Of the 75,696 households in 2010, 36.9% had children under 18 living with them, 52.0% were married couples living together, 16.1% had a female householder with no husband present, and 25.7% were not families. About 20.8% of all households were made up of individuals, and 6.5% had someone living alone who was 65 or older. The average household size was 2.99, and the average family size was 3.48.

At the 2018 American Community Survey, 25.9% of households had children under the age of 18 living with them and the median age was 34.1 Of the adult population, 48.1% were male and 51.9% were female. The average household size was 3.25 and the average family size was 3.71. Roughly 0.3% of households in Garland were same-sex, unmarried-partner households and 5.3% opposite-sex, unmarried-partner households.

According to the U.S. Census Bureau's 2007–2011 American Community Survey, the median income for a household in the city was $52,441, and for a family was $57,293. Males had a median income of $36,041 versus $33,950 for females. The per capita income for the city was $20,000. About 11.1% of families and 14.5% of the population were below the poverty line, including 21.7% of those under age 18 and 7.3% of those age 65 or over. The median income for a household in Garland as of 2018 was $60,374. In 2018, an estimated 242,402 people, 74,489 households, and 77,626 housing units were in the city.

In the city, the population was distributed as 28.5% under the age of 18, 9.6% from 18 to 24, 28.0% from 25 to 44, 24.7% from 45 to 64, and 9.2% who were 65 years of age or older at the 2010 United States census. The median age was 33.7 years. For every 100 females, there were 96.1 males. For every 100 females age 18 and over, there were 92.6 males.

Race and ethnicity 
The racial and ethnic makeup of the city was 57.5% White, 14.5% African American, 0.8% Native American, 9.4% Asian, 0.04% Pacific Islander, 14.4% some other race, and 3.3% from two or more races in 2010. Hispanics or Latinos of any race were 37.8% of the population. Non-Hispanic whites were 36.7% of the population, down from 86.5% in 1980. Following continued trends of diversification, the racial and ethnic makeup at 2018's census estimates were 27% non-Hispanic White, 14% African American, 0.7% American Indian or Alaska Native, 12.4% Asian, 0.5% some other race, 1.7% two or more races, and 43.2% Hispanic or Latino American of any race. Within the local Hispanic or Latino demographic, the largest nationality were Mexican Americans (34.2%). Puerto Ricans made up the second largest single Latin group (0.5%) followed by 42 Cuban Americans and 8.5% other Hispanic and Latino Americans. In 2020, the composition of the city was 27.31% non-Hispanic white, 14.77% Black or African American, 0.25% Native American, 11.88% Asian, 0.03% Pacific Islander, 0.38% some other race, 2.72% multiracial, and 42.66% Hispanic or Latino of any race.

As of 2000, 12% of the foreign-born population of Garland originated from Vietnam. Two strip-style shopping malls along Walnut Street cater to Vietnamese people, and a community center as of 2009 hosts first-generation Vietnamese immigrants. According to the 2010 U.S. census, Garland has the 16th-largest number of Vietnamese Americans in the United States.

Religion 
The majority of Garland's local population are affiliated with a religion, being part of the largest Christian-dominated metropolitan area in the United States. As of 2020, the Catholic Church is the largest single Christian denomination in the city and wider Dallas–Fort Worth–Arlington metropolitan statistical area. Garland's Catholic population is served by the Roman Catholic Diocese of Dallas, one of the largest jurisdictions of the Catholic Church in the United States.

Following, Baptists were the second-largest Christian denomination, and the largest Protestant group in the city limits. Baptists are traditionally divided among the Southern Baptist Convention, National Baptists (USA and America) and Texas Baptists. The third largest Christian denomination in the city of Garland are Methodists. Other prominent Christian denominations were the Church of Jesus Christ of Latter-Day Saints, Pentecostalism, Lutheranism, Presbyterianism, and Episcopalianism. An estimated 12.2% of the total religious population professed another Christian faith. The largest non-Christian religion according to Sperling's BestPlaces was Islam, followed by Judaism and the eastern religions including Buddhism, Sikhism, and Hinduism.

Economy
In the late 1930s, the Craddock food company, which manufactured pickles, moved to town. In 1937, the KRLD (Dallas) radio tower was constructed in Garland. During World War II, several aircraft plants operated in the Garland area. After the war, Kraft Foods bought the Continental Motors Plant to retool for its manufacture. The Kraft plant still operates to this day. As a station on two railroads, Garland was a major onion-shipping point in the 1940s.

Resistol Hats in Garland is a notable manufacturer of premium hats, many of which have been worn by or given to notable figures around the world. The company has long been an important part of Garland's manufacturing base. The company was founded by E.R. Byer and Harry Rolnick, who established Byer-Rolnick in Dallas in 1927. At the time, the company produced men's felt hats. The company used the name "Resistol Hats" to indicate that the hats could "resist-all" weather conditions. Some accounts contend the name was given because the headbands in the company's hats were more resistant to scalp oil. The growing firm needed to expand. In 1938, it moved to a larger facility in Garland, where Resistol hats continue to be manufactured today. For decades, residents surrounding the hat factory could set their clocks to its whistle.

In the early 1980s, Garland had one of the lowest poverty rates of cities in the country. In 1990, it had a population of 180,650 and 2,227 businesses, making it Dallas County's second-largest city and the 10th-largest in the state. Today, Garland had a variety of industries, including electronics, steel fabrication, oilfield equipment, aluminum die casting, hat manufacture, dairy products, and food processors.

Top employers

According to the City of Garland's Economic Development Partnership website, the top employers in the city are:

Garland has lost many of their major employers over the last few years. Raytheon moved to Richardson, Baylor Scott and White closed (but later opened as a VA hospital), L3 Technologies closed, as did many others.

Arts and culture
Garland is home to numerous historic and recent entertainment venues.

Entertainment 
The Granville Arts Center is a complex owned and operated by the city. Included within the complex are two elegant proscenium theatres which seat 720 and 200, respectively. Also included as part of the complex is the Plaza Theatre, which has seating for 350. The Plaza Theatre is a historic entertainment venue. The Plaza Theatre was refurbished and is utilized for business conferences, concerts, receptions, and stage productions. It is also host to paintings by artist Bruce Cody. The Atrium at the Granville Arts Center is a  ballroom encased in glass on two sides and opening onto an elegant outdoor courtyard. The Atrium provides civic, community and commercial organizations the opportunity to house banquets, receptions, trade shows, and conventions.

Landmarks 
Garland is home to the Pace House, which was the original home of John H. Pace and his wife; it was built in the Queen Anne-style architecture. The Pace House was recognized as a historic landmark by the Dallas County Historic Resource Survey of 1982.

Other historic areas of the city include the Garland Landmark Museum, housed in the former 1901 Santa Fe depot. Inside are historical artifacts and documents representing the period from 1850 to the present. Historic Downtown Garland is another local landmark. Historic Downtown Garland was listed in the National Register of Historic Places in 2017.

Travis College Hill Historic District, a residential neighborhood in downtown Garland, was the first site in Garland history to be added to the National Register of Historic Places, administered by the U.S. Department of the Interior through its National Park Service. Two months later, the downtown square and surrounding buildings became the second site in Garland added to the listing. Travis College Hill consists of 12 homes whose period of significance is 1913 to 1960. Travis College Hill was platted in January 1913 by developer R.O. Travis. 

On May 9, 1927, a tornado destroyed much of the city and killed 17 people, including a former mayor, S. E. Nicholson. Six years later, the Nicholson Memorial Library opened in his honor.

The Nicholson Memorial Library System is also the Major Resource Center, or headquarters, of the Northeast Texas Library System (NETLS). NETLS serves a 33-county area that includes 105 member libraries. The Nicholson Memorial Library System headquarters and offices have been housed in NMLS' Central Library since 1983.

Parks and recreation

Government
The city of Garland is a voluntary member of the North Central Texas Council of Governments association, the purpose of which is to coordinate individual and collective local governments and facilitate regional solutions, eliminate unnecessary duplication, and enable joint decisions.

The Parkland Health & Hospital System (Dallas County Hospital District) operates the Garland Health Center.

The Texas Department of Public Safety operates the Region I office in Garland.

The Texas Department of Criminal Justice operates the Dallas II District Parole Offices in Garland.

The United States Postal Service operates the Garland, Kingsley, and North Garland post offices.

Politics

Education

Primary and secondary schools

Most of Garland is in the Garland Independent School District (GISD). Parts of Garland extend into other districts, including the Dallas, Mesquite, and Richardson Independent School Districts.

The GISD does not have school zoning, so GISD residents may apply to any GISD school.

The GISD portion of Garland is served by several high schools. Garland High School is home to the district's international baccalaureate program. North Garland High School is the math, science and technology magnet. Lakeview Centennial High School is GISD's "College and Career" magnet school. South Garland High School is known within the community for its vocational cosmetology program. Other GISD high schools include Naaman Forest, Rowlett, and Sachse High Schools.

The Mesquite ISD portion of Garland is served by Price Elementary School, Vanston Middle School, and North Mesquite High School.

The Richardson ISD portion is served by Big Springs Elementary School, O. Henry Elementary School, Apollo Junior High School, and Berkner High School, which are in the western and northern portions of Garland.

As of November 2006, the GISD had 52,391 students and 3,236 teachers, for an average ratio of 16.2 students per teacher. The 2006 GISD property tax rate was $1.5449 per hundred dollars of assessed property value.

For a private Christian school option, hundreds of families have chosen for their children to attend Garland Christian Academy, which was founded in 1972. The city also has a Pre-K–12 Islamic school, Brighter Horizons Academy.

Colleges and universities

Dallas County residents are zoned to Dallas College (formerly Dallas County Community College or DCCCD). Richland College, a member of Dallas College, states, operates a Garland Campus which has been in operation since June 30, 2009.

Garland is also the home of Amberton University, a fully accredited private university with both undergraduate and graduate degree programs.  Amberton University was formerly known as Amber University and previously known as Abilene Christian University at Dallas.

Infrastructure

Transportation
The city of Garland has a lower than average percentage of households without a car. In 2015, 4.6 percent of Garland households lacked a car, and that figure was virtually unchanged in 2016 (4.4 percent). The national average was 8.7 percent in 2016. Garland averaged 2.04 cars per household in 2016, compared to a national average of 1.8. According to the American Community Survey for 2016 (5-year average), 78.8 percent of Garland residents commuted by driving alone, 13.1 carpooled, 2.5 used public transportation, and .9 percent walked. About 1.3 percent of Garland residents commuted to work by bicycle, taxi, motorcycle, or some other means, while 3.5 percent worked out of the home.

Major highways
  Interstate 30 is a major east–west interstate that runs through the south side of Garland. I-30 connects with Mesquite and Dallas to the west and Rockwall to the east.
  Interstate 635 (Lyndon B. Johnson Freeway) is an auxiliary interstate serving as a partial loop around Dallas and its suburbs. The interstate runs along the southwest section of Garland and serves as a border between Dallas and Garland. I-635 connects Garland with major freeways (such as North Central Expressway and Stemmons Freeway) and Dallas/Fort Worth International Airport.
  Texas State Highway 66 is an east–west highway that terminates at a junction with Highway 78 in downtown Garland. East of downtown the highway connects with Rowlett and Rockwall.
  Texas State Highway 78 (Garland Road, Lavon Drive) is a north–south highway that bisects the city of Garland and goes through the downtown area. The highway is known as Garland Road south of downtown and Lavon Drive north of downtown. In downtown Garland it transverses as a pair of roads known as Avenue D and 1st Street on the northbound section and Avenue B on the southbound section. Highway 78 connects with Sachse and Wylie to the north and East Dallas to the south.
  President George Bush Turnpike is a toll road that serves as a loop around Dallas County. George Bush Turnpike runs through the northern parts of Garland. The turnpike connects with Richardson and Plano to the west and Rowlett to the east.
 Belt Line Loop (some parts are named as First Street and Broadway Blvd) serves as an outer loop around the Dallas suburbs.

Trains

A Kansas City Southern track runs parallel to State Highway 78 (Garland Road and Lavon Drive), coming out of Dallas and heading all the way through the other side of Garland towards Wylie. There is also a Dallas, Garland and Northeastern Railroad line serving industries around the city.

Light rail
 DART: Blue Line
 Forest/Jupiter station
 Downtown Garland station

Air
The city of Garland owns the Garland/DFW Heloplex. The facility was the first municipal heliport in Texas when it opened in November 1989. Located at 2559 S. Jupiter Road, the heliport is operated by SKY Helicopters Inc., which was initially awarded a lease of the facility in January 1993.

Utilities
The city of Garland operates the city's water system and waste services. Electricity for about 85% of Garland is provided by the city's municipal utility, Garland Power and Light (GP&L). Electricity for the other 15% was formerly provided by TXU, but is now supplied by multiple companies after deregulation of the Texas electricity market.

Water and wastewater utilities

Garland is an original member city of the North Texas Municipal Water District (NTMWD).  The vision of the city fathers in the early 1940s resulted in Garland and its companion member cities benefitting from reliable, high quality, affordable water from the water district's many reservoirs.

The effluent from Garland's wastewater treatment plant flows through a NTMWD man-made,  wetland.  This provides a natural habitat for a wide variety of birds and reduces the sediment, nitrogen, and phosphorus contents of the water to a drinkable level. Through the use of selected aquatic plants, this environmentally friendly project will provide millions of gallons of reusable water and reduce the environmental impact.

Garland Power and Light

GP&L was founded in 1923 to provide Garland residents not-for-profit public utility services, locally controlled by its citizens. GP&L provides services to over 69,000 customers, making it the fourth-largest municipal utility in Texas and the 41st-largest in the nation.
It has two gas-fired generating plants, which combined have 640 megawatts of generation capacity. In addition, Garland partners with the Texas Municipal Power Agency, which operates the 462-megawatt coal-fired Gibbons Creek Power Plant. Garland's peak load for 2007 was 483 megawatts, with annual operating revenues of nearly $238 million.

Notable people

 Tyson Ballou, model
 Crystal Bernard, starred as K.C. Cunningham on the TV sitcom Happy Days and as Helen in the show Wings
 Mookie Blaylock, NBA basketball player
 Johnny Yong Bosch, actor, musician, and martial artist, raised in Garland
 C. L. Bryant, Baptist minister and conservative talk-show host, resided in Garland
 Amber Dotson, country music artist
 Brian Adam Douglas, Brooklyn-based artist
 Samuel Eguavoen, football player
 William Jackson Harper, actor and playwright, grew up in Garland
 Caleb Landry Jones, actor
 Chris Jones (born 1993), basketball player for Maccabi Tel Aviv of the Israeli Basketball Premier League
 Tyrese Maxey, University of Kentucky basketball and Philadelphia 76ers basketball player
 Adrienne Reese, professional wrestler Athena, currently of All Elite Wrestling and Ring of Honor, previously known as Ember Moon in WWE
 Mitchel Musso, actor and musician 
 Adrian Phillips, NFL football player
 Ricky Pierce, NBA guard, NBA All-Star, 2x winner of NBA 6th Man Of The Year Award, raised in Garland
 LeAnn Rimes, musician, grew up in Garland
 Gene Summers, musician
 Lee Trevino, professional golfer, winner of six major championships and 29 PGA Tour events, World Golf Hall of Fame member (1981), was born in Garland (1939) 
 LTC Allen West, chair of Texas GOP; former Florida Congressman
 Ian Clare, WA State tennis champion, born in Garland

See also

 Curtis Culwell Center attack

Notes

References

Bibliography

External links

 City of Garland
 Garland Landmark Society
 

 
Cities in Collin County, Texas
Cities in Dallas County, Texas
Dallas–Fort Worth metroplex
Populated places established in 1891
1891 establishments in Texas
Cities in Texas